Mariano Corsico (born 9 May 1981) is an Argentine football player. He started his career with Argentine club Talleres Córdoba and played for Cypriot club Olympiakos Nicosia.

References

External links 
 Argentine Primera stats at Futbol XXI 
 Mariano Corsico at BDFA.com.ar 
 Profile and career data from Football Plus

1981 births
Living people
Footballers from Córdoba, Argentina
Talleres de Córdoba footballers
LB Châteauroux players
Sport Boys footballers
Deportivo Municipal footballers
Olympiakos Nicosia players
Cypriot First Division players
Argentine footballers
Argentine expatriate footballers
Expatriate footballers in Cyprus
Expatriate footballers in France
Expatriate footballers in Peru
Association football midfielders
Argentine expatriate sportspeople in the Netherlands
Argentine expatriate sportspeople in Cyprus
Argentine expatriate sportspeople in Peru